The FOW Light Heavyweight Championship was a professional wrestling title in American independent promotion Future of Wrestling. The title was created when Johnny Vandal won the title in Davie, Florida on December 1, 2001. It was defended throughout southern Florida, most often in Davie, Plantation, Boca Raton and occasionally in Orlando, Florida. The title was abandoned shortly before the promotion closed in early 2003. There have been a total of 9 recognized individual champions, who have had a combined 22 official reigns.

Title history

Combined reigns

References

External links
FOW Official Title History
 FOW Light Heavyweight Championship

Light heavyweight wrestling championships